Titans East is the name of several DC Comics superhero teams. The teams appear in the Teen Titans comic books and animated series. The comic book incarnation of Titans East first appeared in Teen Titans (vol. 3) #18 (2005) during the "Titans Tomorrow" storyline, which is set in the future. A present-day incarnation appeared in Teen Titans (vol. 3) #43 (2007), as a group of villains led by Deathstroke. Cyborg later assembled a new version of the team.

Team history
Titans East is based on the Teen Titans' west-coast counterpart Titans West, a team of lesser-known teenage heroes including Beast Boy, Flamebird, and Hawk and Dove. Currently, the "main" Titans team is based in San Francisco, California, on the West Coast.

Titans Tomorrow

The original Titans East first appeared in the "Titans Tomorrow" storyline in which the Teen Titans meet their villainous older selves in the future. This incarnation of Titans East is a group of former Titans rebelling against the future Titans' rule over the Western United States:
Batwoman (Bette Kane): Formerly Flamebird and ex-lover of Tim Drake.
Bumblebee (Karen Beecher-Duncan): Co-leader of Titans East.
Captain Marvel (Freddy Freeman): Formerly Captain Marvel Jr. and successor to the power of the wizard Shazam.
Cyborg 2.0 (Victor Stone): An upgraded Cyborg and co-leader of Titans East along with Bumblebee.
Flash (Bart Allen): Works with Titans West as an agent for Titans East.
Ravager (Rose Wilson): Daughter of Deathstroke.
Terra (Tara Markov): Geo-elemental

Deathstroke's Titans

Deathstroke created a group that he called "Titans East" specifically to take down the Teen Titans.

At the conclusion of the arc, Deathstroke mused to himself that he only created the Titans East to drive his own children, current Teen Titan members Ravager and Jericho, into staying with the Teen Titans. Deathstroke believed that since he could not be a proper father to them, he would manipulate them into fully accepting the Titans as their family, thus fulfilling his twisted sense of being a good father in the end. This version of characters disbanded after the storyline ended:
Batgirl (Cassandra Cain): The new leader of the League of Assassins, and more importantly, the only fighter to completely dominate Ravager. Deathstroke believes that Batgirl's skills and past with Robin and the other Gotham Knights will give them an edge against the Boy Wonder. It has been revealed that Deathstroke is using the same serum he used on Rose on Cassandra. Given an antiserum, she allies with Robin and the Titans before disappearing.
Bombshell: Sent by Deathstroke to spy on the Titans and get a disc containing the soul of his son, Jericho. After the Titans discovered she was a traitor and put her in prison, Cyborg and Miss Martian went to interrogate her. When Bombshell refused to say anything, Miss Martian tried reading her mind and discovered she was a member of Titans East. Before she could learn anything else, Risk broke in and Batgirl slit her throat.
Duela Dent (also known as the Joker's Daughter): Completely insane, but also a former Titan. Deathstroke believes dealing with her insanity is worth the information Duela has. She had joined Robin's Titans team when Raven offered her membership in exchange for aid against the Titans East.
Enigma: A late add-on to the team and was not mentioned until the solicit for Teen Titans vol. 3, #43, was released. Originally referred to as Riddler's Daughter, future solicits for Teen Titans refer to her as Enigma.
Inertia: A genetic clone of former Titan Bart Allen. Inertia was once a natural speedster, but lost his ability when the Speed Force was isolated in Bart, and now relies on a speed-inducing chemical created by Deathstroke, who feels a speedster will be very useful.
Kid Crusader: The only person Deathstroke could find who has both heard of Kid Devil and wants to eliminate him.
Match: Clone of Superboy. While his Superman-level strength is a bonus for the team, Deathstroke thinks Match also gives the team a psychological advantage. Deathstroke is counting on his appearance to throw Wonder Girl, the Titans' most physically powerful member, off balance, as she was Superboy's girlfriend. Match's outfit is altered to resemble Superboy's last costume before his death, although he has come to look more like a Bizarro duplicate of him, complete with a reverse "S" shield on his black T-shirt. It also appears that his intellect, like his body, is rotting away.
Risk: Lost an arm fighting with the Titans against Superman-Prime and is "furious at the world" over it. Deathstroke believes he can manipulate Risk and thinks the Titans will hesitate in battle out of guilt.
Sun Girl: Harnesses the power of the sun. She is also a master manipulator, much like the original Terra.

Titans East Special

In November 2007, DC released a one-shot special called Titans East Special, written by Judd Winick with art by Ian Churchill and Norm Rapmund. In the special, Cyborg was assembling a group of young heroes to train as the new "Titans East". These members included:
Anima
Hawk and Dove
Lagoon Boy
Little Barda
Power Boy - a native of Apokolips.
Son of Vulcan

However, during an early training mission they were attacked and seriously injured or killed by an unknown assailant. In Titans (vol. 2) #1, it was revealed that all but Power Boy survived. Anima, Son of Vulcan, and Lagoon Boy are comatose; Little Barda is in critical condition; Cyborg is unconscious, but in stable condition; and Hawk and Dove are in stable condition. The source of the attack is believed to be the demon Trigon, a former Titans foe. Cyborg later wakes up, but, waiting for new replacement limbs, is left strapped to a hoverchair. In such diminished form, he disbands the Titans East to join the new Titans group upon discovering that Trigon's offspring may be responsible for the events.

In other media
In the Teen Titans animated series, the Titans East form as a result of Brother Blood's continued "activities" for the H.I.V.E. Cyborg is the temporary leader of the team in the episode "Titans East", in which he helps build their Titans Tower and helps them become a cohesive team, acting as a mentor-like mediator of sorts. Their Tower was attacked and nearly destroyed by Brother Blood's army of robotic Cyclones (made from Cyborg's blueprints), and while Cyborg was fighting Blood himself, the Cyclones captured and brainwashed the other East Titans. They became unwilling, mind-controlled servants of Brother Blood, to be used as part of a trap for Cyborg, but became a true superhero team upon being freed. The episode "For Real" spotlights the Titans East as they occupy the main Titans' city in their absence. They also make several cameo-like appearances while battling the Brotherhood of Evil in the "Calling All Titans" and "Titans Together" episodes, which mark the end of conflict between the Brotherhood and the Titans.

The members of this Titans East are:
Cyborg (temporary leader)
Bumblebee (leader)
Aqualad
Speedy
Más y Menos

References

External links
DCU: One Year Greater Panel

2005 in comics
Comics characters introduced in 2005
DC Comics superhero teams
DC Comics supervillain teams
Characters created by Geoff Johns